Gwynneville may refer to these places:

 Gwynneville, Indiana, a town in the United States
 Gwynneville, New South Wales, a suburb of Wollongong, Australia